Ragged Keys are small islands north of the upper Florida Keys.

They are located in Biscayne Bay, just north of Sands Key, and are part of Biscayne National Park.

Earlier names for these islands were "Knox Island", "Laurence Island", "Los Paradisos", "Mascaras", "Mucaras", "Mucasas", "Pollock Island" and "Soldiers Island".

History 
Bernard Romans, who visited these keys in 1774, wrote that these were "Seven rocks called Mascaras", which he said had been "Ill copied on English charts as Mucares".

The northernmost of these islands, Ragged Key #1 has been inhabited in the past. The remains of an old wooden dock are in hazardous condition. The deteriorated concrete wall encircles majority of the island. The remains of previous development are concrete pillars and what used to be a cistern and looks like a broken concrete tank.

References

Islands of the Florida Keys
Uninhabited islands of Miami-Dade County, Florida
Biscayne National Park
Islands of Florida